L'Aigle d'Or is a 1984 French action video game by Loriciels.

Development 
The game had an initial investment of approximately 100,000 FF and took three months of work.

Release 
Games & Strategy suggested that in the Loriciels catalog, the game was "only (and wrongly)" cited as a role-playing game. Microphone anticipated the game's release on MO5 to be successful due to the recent success of its Oric release. The game peaked at 30,000 copies sold.

Critical reception 
Tilt wrote the game is: "the precursor of a new range of adventure software, which will be more and more realistic, more and more “real”. An undeniable success." Micro 7 gave it a rating of 5 out of 5 stars.

Legacy 
The game has been described as reminiscent of the Thomson MO5 video game Thesaurus and the Oric (acquired by Atmos) title Le secret du tombeau. Tilt noted that publishers were using "drastic measures to extract the quintessence of the Thomson TO7/70", citing L'Aigle d'Or, Thesarus, and Mandragore in the adventure and role-playing genres.

It had a sequel in 1992 called L'Aigle d'or, le retour.

See also 

 Le Mystère de Kikekankoi, Loriciels' follow-up game in 1985.

References 

1984 video games
Amstrad CPC games
Oric games
Thomson MO games
Thomson TO games
Video games developed in France
Virtual Studio games